Susan Kelly Power (1925–2022) was an American author and activist and member of the Yanktonai Dakota First Nation. She founded the American Indian Center of Chicago, which provided services for Native American peoples.

Early life 
Susan Louise Kelly Power was originally from Fort Yates, North Dakota. She was born on the Standing Rock Sioux Reservation in 1925.  was enrolled in an Indian Boarding School and later briefly sent to a Catholic boarding school within South Dakota and was then sent back to North Dakota to Bismarck Indian School. While in these schools, Susan faced physical and mental abuse from school staff. Due to unforeseen circumstances, in 1942 she arrived in Chicago to work where she eventually stayed due to financial constraints.

Susan was part of a large family, with seven siblings and parents Josephine and Colvin Kelly. Susan had close bonds with her sisters and a warm family life. Her Mother was one of her role models.

Career 
Power worked in a factory and edited legal publications for the University of Chicago Law School. She held positions at the Museum of Science & Industry, the Salvation Army, and the US Census Bureau. Power was active with Native groups such as the Indian Council Fire and the National Congress of American Indians, becoming was the organization's youngest member at the time of its creation in 1944.

She launched the American Indian Center of Chicago in 1953. On February 20, 2016, Power spoke at a community event at the center.

American Indian Centre 
In a basement, Ms. Power and others helped establish what evolved into the American Indian Center of Chicago (AIC) in 1953. This center is the country’s oldest urban American Indian center. This center was a place where individuals were assisted in connecting to housing and employment opportunities. It offers Native American people social services, youth and elder programs, cultural education, and gathering opportunities. The center is located at 3401 West Ainslie Street. AIC was established to assist Native families deal with the transition from life on the reservation to urban life as a result of this influx  of reservation Indians.

History 
American Indians have historically received assistance from AIC. American Indians from all over were relocated to metropolitan Chicago in the 1950s as a result of federal programs including the Indian Relocation Program.

Mission 
AIC's mission is to foster relationships of understanding and communication between Indians and non-Indians residing in metro Chicago, as well as among Indian people of all Tribes. They additionally aim to aid their economic progress, support their cultural, artistic, and extracurricular endeavors, and perpetuate Indian cultural values.

Family 
She is survived by her daughter Mona Susan Power, stepson Douglas Power, and his wife Jeanann Glassford Power, stepdaughter Marjorie Mbilinyi, and grandchildren Douglas Drew and Alessandra Power, Nnali, Anina, and Lyungai Mbilinyi. Power was preceded in death by her husband Carleton G. Power, who died in 1973.

Works 

Novels

 The Grass Dancer, 1994
 Roofwalker, 2002
 Sacred wilderness, 2014

References 

1925 births
2022 deaths
Native American activists
Native American novelists
Yankton Dakota people
People from Sioux County, North Dakota